Christie Albert Macaluso (born June 12, 1945) is an American prelate of the Catholic Church.  He served as auxiliary bishop of the Archdiocese of Hartford in Connecticut from 1997 to 2017. Since 2017 he serves as auxiliary bishop emeritus of Hartford.

Biography

Early life and education
Christie Macaluso was born on June 12, 1945, in Hartford, Connecticut, to Albert Carl and Helen (née Meaney) Macaluso; his father's family was from Palermo, Sicily, and his mother was of Irish descent. 

Macaluso studied at St. Thomas Seminary in Bloomfield, Connecticut, and St. Mary's Seminary in Baltimore, Maryland, obtaining a Bachelor of Philosophy degree and a Master of Sacred Theology degree. He also holds a Master of Philosophy degree from Trinity College, and a Master of Psychology degree from New York University.

Priesthood
Macaluso was ordained to the priesthood for the Archdiocese of Hartford by Archbishop John Francis Whealon on May 22, 1971. After his ordination, Macaluso served as assistant pastor at St. Thomas the Apostle Parish in West Hartford, Connecticut, and at St. Joseph Parish in New Britain, Connecticut.

Macaluso later became a professor of philosophy at St. Thomas Seminary. In 1980, he was appointed dean of the seminary and rector in 1985. While serving as rector, Macaluso was also assigned as a weekend assistant pastor at St. Francis Parish in Torrington, Connecticut, and Sacred Heart Parish in Bloomfield, Connecticut.

In 1991, Macaluso was named pastor of the Cathedral of St. Joseph Parish in Hartford.  He was also appointed as episcopal vicar for the Hartford Vicariate in 1995. Macaluso was also raised by the Vatican to the rank of honorary prelate of his holiness in 1995.

Auxiliary Bishop of Hartford
On March 18, 1997, Pope John Paul II appointed Macaluso as an auxiliary bishop of the Archdiocese of Hartford and titular bishop of Grass Valley. He was consecrated on June 10, 1997, by Archbishop Daniel Cronin, with bishops Paul Loverde and Peter A. Rosazza serving as co-consecrators. Macaluso selected as his episcopal motto: "", meaning "" (John 8:32).

As an auxiliary bishop, Macaluso served as vicar general of the archdiocese and moderator of the curia.

Pope Francis accepted Macaluso's letter of resignation as auxiliary bishop of the Diocese of Hartford on December 15, 2017.  In retirement, he serves as auxiliary bishop emeritus of Hartford.

See also
 

 Catholic Church hierarchy
 Catholic Church in the United States
 Historical list of the Catholic bishops of the United States
 List of Catholic bishops of the United States
 Lists of patriarchs, archbishops, and bishops

References

External links

 Roman Catholic Archdiocese of Hartford

Episcopal succession

1945 births
Living people
20th-century Roman Catholic bishops in the United States
St. Thomas Seminary alumni
St. Mary's Seminary and University alumni
Trinity College (Connecticut) alumni
New York University alumni
Roman Catholic auxiliary bishops of Hartford
21st-century Roman Catholic bishops in the United States